Rinchen, meaning "treasure", is a Tibetan name, used by speakers of various Tibetic languages. It is also used as a given name by Mongols, seen as early as the Yuan dynasty. As a Mongolian name, it has various spellings such as Rinchin, Renchin, or Erinchin. People with Rinchen as one of their given names, or as a patronymic, include:

Buddhist leaders and teachers
Rinchen Chok of Ma, one of the disciples of Padmasambhava
Rinchen Zangpo (958–1055), translator of Sanskrit Buddhist texts into Tibetan
Yeshe Rinchen (1248–1294), Imperial Preceptor at the court of the Yuan dynasty
Rinchen Gyaltsen (–1305), ruler of the Sakya school
Buton Rinchen Drub (1290–1364), eleventh abbot of Shalu Monastery
Gendün Rinchen (1926–1997), 69th Je Khenpo of Bhutan
Sonam Rinchen (1933–2013), teacher of Buddhist philosophy and practice in Dharamshala, India

Mongol nobility
Rinchinbal Khan (1326–1332), tenth emperor of the Yuan dynasty
Erinchin Lobsang Tayiji, prince of the Khalkha federation of Western Mongolia
Sengge Rinchen (1811–1865), Qing dynasty nobleman and general from Inner Mongolia

Other
Byambyn Rinchen (1905–1977), Mongolian scholar of linguistics and literature
Chewang Rinchen (1931–1997), Indian army officer from Ladakh
Rinchen Lhamo (1901–1929), writer from Kham who settled in the United Kingdom
Rinchen Barsbold (born 1935), Mongolian paleontologist
Ngawang Rinchen (born 1984), Chinese actor
Pema Rinchen (born 1986), Bhutanese footballer

See also
Renchinlkhümbe, a sum (district) in Khövsgöl, northern Mongolia
Rinchen Subtso, a lake in Shigatse Prefecture, Tibet Autonomous Region, China
Rinchenia, a genus of Dinosauria named after Rinchen Barsbold

References

Tibetan names
Mongolian given names